The Criterion Theatre is a West End theatre at Piccadilly Circus, London, England. Other theatres with that name include:

in Australia
Criterion Theatre (Sydney), a demolished theatre in Sydney, Australia 

in England
Criterion Theatre (Coventry), a theatre in Earlsdon, Coventry, England 

in the United States
Criterion Theatre (Bar Harbor, Maine), listed on the National Register of Historic Places listings in Maine
Criterion Theatre (New York), former theatre in the Olympia Theatre, Broadway, Manhattan